Rasbora truncata is a species of ray-finned fish in the genus Rasbora. It is endemic to the Alas River in northwestern Sumatra.

References 

Rasboras
Freshwater fish of Sumatra
Taxa named by Daniel Lumbantobing
Fish described in 2010